AAPB may refer to:

 Aerobic anoxygenic phototrophic bacteria
 American Archive of Public Broadcasting
 American Association of Pathologists and Bacteriologists
 Association for Applied Psychophysiology and Biofeedback
 American Association of Professional Baseball